Treaty of Jaffa may refer to:

Treaty of Jaffa (1192), ended the Third Crusade
Treaty of Jaffa (1229), ended the Sixth Crusade